Robert Chiarelli (born September 24, 1941) is a Canadian politician. He was a Liberal member in the Legislative Assembly of Ontario who served from 1987 to 1997 and again from 2010 to 2018 who represented the ridings of Ottawa West and Ottawa West—Nepean. He was the Regional Chair of Ottawa-Carleton from 1997 to 2001 and was mayor of Ottawa from 2001 to 2006. He served in the provincial cabinets of Dalton McGuinty and Kathleen Wynne. Chiarelli was a candidate for Mayor of Ottawa in the 2022 Ottawa municipal election.

Background
Chiarelli was raised in the Little Italy area of Ottawa near Preston Street. His parents were entrepreneurs owning a number of stores in the neighbourhood. He was the youngest of their seven children. He was an ice hockey player in high school and attended Clarkson University, New York, on a hockey scholarship. He received a Bachelor of Business Administration degree, and then returned to Ottawa to attend the University of Ottawa law school.  He began his legal practice in 1969. He served for seven years on the National Capital Commission. He lives in Ottawa with his partner Randi Hansen, and has five adult children and two grandchildren.

Provincial politics
Chiarelli entered politics in 1987, where he ran as a Liberal candidate in the 1987 provincial election in the riding of Ottawa West. He defeated  Progressive Conservative candidate  Derek Insley by about 6,000 votes.  He served as the parliamentary assistant to the Chair of the Management Board in 1987–88.  Chiarelli was re-elected in the provincial elections of 1990 and 1995. Chiarelli endorsed Dalton McGuinty's bid to lead the Ontario Liberal Party in 1996.

He resigned his seat in 1997 in order to pursue a position in municipal politics.

Return to provincial politics
In 2010, Chiarelli ran as the Liberal Party candidate in a by-election held in the riding of Ottawa West–Nepean to succeed Jim Watson who resigned to run for  Mayor of Ottawa. He won the by-election, which was held on March 4. Chiarelli was re-elected in the 2011 and 2014 elections.

On August 18, 2010, Chiarelli was appointed to cabinet as Minister of Public Infrastructure and Renewal.

On June 7, 2018, Chiarelli was defeated in the provincial election. He placed 3rd, behind the PC and NDP local candidates. The Progressive Conservatives, led by Doug Ford, won a sizeable majority government, ending 15 consecutive years of Liberal power.

Municipal politics
In November 1997, Chiarelli contested the position of Regional Chair of Ottawa-Carleton. He defeated incumbent Peter Clark. Chiarelli's win was the only Ottawa municipal contest where an incumbent was upset. For the next three years, he advocated eliminating the region's "two-tiered" government, and  amalgamating the regional municipalities into a single city.  The provincial government of Mike Harris did this in 2000, and Chiarelli declared himself a candidate to become the first mayor of the amalgamated city of Ottawa.

Chiarelli was elected as the first mayor of the newly amalgamated city of Ottawa on November 13, 2000 defeating former mayor of Gloucester, Ontario, Claudette Cain. He was easily re-elected in the 2003 election beating his closest rival by nearly 40,000 votes.

2006 election

In the 2006 election, he ran for re-election against two main opponents: former Kanata councillor Alex Munter, and businessman Larry O'Brien. Terry Kilrea, runner-up to Chiarelli in 2003, campaigned through the summer but withdrew when it seemed left-wing candidate Alex Munter had taken the lead. Kilrea decided to support Chiarelli for the remainder of the campaign.

Chiarelli's main project was the expansion of the city's light-rail system: a north-south line would run from Barrhaven to downtown Ottawa starting in 2009. His opponents in the election alleged that the project had been undertaken without sufficient consultation or communication with the public. The project was cancelled shortly after his departure of City Hall.

Chiarelli also had plans to improve the east end of the city. He introduced a 10-point revitalization plan that would include attracting more jobs and businesses east of the Rideau River in order to improve its economic development. He also planned to build new roads to improve connections between Orleans and the south end of the city. Also he promised to expand the existing bike trail system with additional trails connecting suburban and rural areas of Ottawa.

In a survey conducted by UniMarketing during the week of October 13, 2006, Chiarelli placed second with an 11-point percentage deficit on Munter but had a three-point advantage over O'Brien among the most likely to vote. In the election, he finished in third position with just over 15% of the vote and lost the mayoral position to O'Brien.

Return to municipal politics

On December 10, 2021, Chiarelli announced his intention to return to municipal politics, declaring himself a candidate for his former job as mayor in the 2022 municipal election. He finished third with 5.08% of the vote.

Electoral record

References

External links
 

1941 births
Canadian people of Italian descent
Chairs of the Regional Municipality of Ottawa-Carleton
Clarkson University alumni
Ice hockey people from Ottawa
Lawyers in Ontario
Living people
Mayors of Ottawa
Members of the Executive Council of Ontario
Ontario Liberal Party MPPs
University of Ottawa alumni
University of Ottawa Faculty of Law alumni
21st-century Canadian politicians